"Mal de Amor"  is the fourth single from Juan Luis Guerra's sixth studio album Areíto, released in 1993 by Karem Records. The song was written and produced by Guerra. The track encompasses traditional merengue with Cumbia.  The song was the fourth consecutive single from the album to reach the top-ten on the Billboard Hot Latin Songs chart in the United States. It also reached the top-ten in Venezuela.

Track listing 

 Spain CD-single (1993)
 Mal De Amor - 3:46
 Naboira/Daca Mayanimacana - 2:25

Charts

References 

1993 singles
1993 songs
Juan Luis Guerra songs
Songs written by Juan Luis Guerra